Hoxha is an Albanian surname, derived from the Persian title khawaja ("master") via Turkish hoca. It is the most common surname in Albania. "Hoxha" could refer to several people:

 Enver Hoxha (1908–1985), Communist leader of Albania in 1944–1985
 Iljas Mirahori (Iljaz Hoxha), 15th-century Albanian Janissary, scientist, and teacher of an Ottoman sultan
 Hysen Hoxha (1861–1934), a signatory of the Albanian Declaration of Independence; uncle of Enver Hoxha
 Fadil Hoxha (1916–2001), Yugoslav politician and Kosovo's leader during the time of Tito
 Nexhmije Hoxha (1921–2020), Albanian politician, wife of Enver Hoxha
 Luan Hoxha (born 1960), Chief of General Staff of the Armed Forces of Albania in 2006–2008
 Anna Hoxha (stage name: Anna Oxa) (born 1961), Italian singer 
 Ferit Hoxha (born 1967), Albanian diplomat
 Dritan Hoxha (1968–2008), Albanian businessman
 Erand Hoxha (born 1985), Albanian footballer
 Rigers Hoxha (born 1985), Albanian footballer
 Alban Hoxha (born 1987), Albanian football goalkeeper
 Yll Hoxha (born 1987), Kosovar football player
 Altin Hoxha (born 1990), Albanian footballer
 Sulejman Hoxha (born 1990), Albanian footballer
 Hamels Hoxha (born 1992), Albanian footballer
 Sidni Hoxha (born 1992), Albanian swimmer
 Bedri Hoxha, Albanian politician
 Bujar Hoxha, Albanian chess master
 Fatos Hoxha, Albanian politician
 Ismail Hoxha, Albanian politician
 Rajmond Hoxha, Albanian politician

Albanian-language surnames